Macmillan New Writing is an imprint of the British publishing company Pan Macmillan. Designed to attract previously unpublished authors, it offers aspiring novelists 20% of royalties from the sale of their book but no advance on signing. Books Macmillan New Writing has published have been shortlisted for the Orange Prize for Fiction, the CWA New Blood Dagger, the Edgar Award for best paperback original, the Romantic Novelists' Association's Romantic Novel of the Year, and the Wales Book of the Year.

A Partial List of Authors
 MFW Curran
 Maggie Dana
 Aliya Whiteley
 Jonathan Drapes
 Michael Stephen Fuchs
 Frances Garrood
 Eliza Graham
 Ryan David Jahn
 Lucy McCarraher
 James McCreet
 Brian McGilloway
 Roger Morris (English writer)
 Suroopa Mukherjee
 L C Tyler
 Doug Worgul

References
"A Gamble That's Paying Off". Publishing News, April 30, 2008
"Out on a wing with 'Ryanair-style' publishing". The Guardian, April 30, 2005

External links
Macmillan New Writing official site

Macmillan New Writing
Publishing companies based in London
Holtzbrinck Publishing Group